Julian Korb (born 21 March 1992) is a German professional footballer who plays as a right back for  club Holstein Kiel.

Club career 
Korb played in TuS Preußen Vluyn, Hülser SV und DJK/VfL Tönisberg youth teams. In 2004, Korb joined MSV Duisburg youth academy, and two years afterwards, in 2006, Korb joined Borussia Mönchengladbach youth academy. He then spent the next five years developing in Gladbach's academy, before making his debut in a senior game in January 2010, with the B team of Gladbach.

On 5 May 2012, Korb was handed his first team debut by manager Lucien Favre in a 3–0 Bundesliga win over Mainz 05, coming off the bench in the 73rd minute to replace Tolga Cigerci. On 6 December 2012, he made his UEFA Europa League debut, in the 3–0 group stage win over Fenerbahçe.

In 2013–14 season, Korb made his breakthrough into the Bundesliga. He made 22 appearances in this season, helping Gladbach to qualify to UEFA Champions League group stage. He also helped the club to do so in the next two years afterwards.

Korb joined Hannover 96 in summer 2017.

International career
Korb made ten appearances in Germany under-21 and previously represented the U15, U17 and U19 teams of Germany.

Career statistics

References

1992 births
Living people
German footballers
Association football midfielders
Germany youth international footballers
Germany under-21 international footballers
MSV Duisburg players
Bundesliga players
2. Bundesliga players
Regionalliga players
Borussia Mönchengladbach players
Borussia Mönchengladbach II players
Hannover 96 players
Holstein Kiel players
Footballers from Essen